Balmford is a surname. Notable people with the surname include:

Andrew Balmford, British ecologist
James Balmford (1556–after 1623), English clergyman
Mary Balmford (1907–1969), British sculptor
Rosemary Balmford (1933–2017), Australian judge, barrister, solicitor and legal academic
Samuel Balmford (died 1657), English Puritan minister

See also
Bamford
Balmforth